Thomas Dannhauser du Plessis (born 29 Junie 1953) is a former South African rugby union player.

Playing career

Du Plessis played for Northern Transvaal and the Springboks. He made his international debut for the Springboks against the visiting South American Jaguars team on 26 April 1980 at the Wanderers Stadium, Johannesburg. He scored his first and only test try in his first test. Du Plessis played in two test matches for the Springboks and scored the one try.

Test history

See also
List of South Africa national rugby union players – Springbok no. 503

References

1953 births
Living people
South African rugby union players
South Africa international rugby union players
Rugby union scrum-halves
Blue Bulls players
Rugby union players from Gauteng